Àngel Rangel Zaragoza (born 28 November 1982) is a Spanish former footballer who played as a right-back, currently manager of Pontardawe Town's under-12 team.

After playing lower league football in his native country for six years, he went on to spend most of his professional career with Swansea City, winning promotion to the Premier League in 2011 and appearing in 374 competitive matches.

Rangel signed for Queens Park Rangers in 2018, and retired from playing two years later.

Club career

Swansea City
Born in Sant Carles de la Ràpita, Tarragona, Catalonia, Rangel represented CD Tortosa, CF Reus Deportiu, Girona FC, UE Sant Andreu and Terrassa FC in his homeland, never in higher than the Segunda División B. In summer 2007, he signed for Swansea City in the English League One on a one-year performance-related deal, for an undisclosed fee; countryman Roberto Martínez was the team's manager.

Rangel played a massive role in his first season as the Swans returned to the Championship after a 24-year absence, as league champions. He scored his first goal for them on 27 November 2007, netting eight minutes from time in a 1–0 home win against Hartlepool United. Two weeks later, again at the Liberty Stadium, he netted in a 3–0 victory over Southend United. In April 2008, he was one of five team players to make the PFA League One Team of the Year alongside Ferrie Bodde, Garry Monk, Andy Robinson and the league's top scorer Jason Scotland.

On 5 September 2008, Rangel signed a new contract until June 2010. He continued to feature prominently in the following years and, in mid-February 2010, agreed to an extension until June 2011.

The 2010–11 campaign was a successful one for both Swansea and Rangel, as the former were promoted to the Premier League for the first time in their history following a 4–2 defeat of Reading in the play-off final at Wembley Stadium. In spite of missing several weeks early on with a thigh muscle tear, he contributed to the feat with two goals from 41 appearances, scoring at Doncaster Rovers in a 1–1 draw and at home to Millwall which also ended in a 1–1 draw. In late June 2011, he put pen to paper to a new three-year deal.

In November 2011, Rangel was voted best defender in the Premier League. He played 34 matches during the season, helping the team retain their league status.

Rangel scored his first goal in the English top flight on 25 August 2012, in a 3–0 home win over West Ham United. On 8 March 2013, he signed a new contract with Swansea, keeping him at the club until 2016.

On 19 April 2015, one month after again extending his link, now until 2017, Rangel was selected in The Football Manager Team of the Decade at the Football League Awards. On 14 November 2017, he was named new captain after Leon Britton stepped down to become a player-assistant manager.

Rangel was released at the end of the 2017–18 campaign.

Queens Park Rangers
Rangel spent time in the 2018 off-season training with Indian Super League club Bengaluru FC during their tour of Valencia. On 15 August, he joined Championship side Queens Park Rangers on a one-year contract.

On 14 August 2020, Rangel left Loftus Road, remaining there to be assisted through his rehabilitation from an Achilles tendon injury. The following 20 April, however, the 38-year-old announced his retirement.

In May 2022, Rangel was appointed manager of Pontardawe Town's under-12 team.

International career
Rangel was believed to qualify to represent Wales on residency grounds, but was ruled ineligible in July 2012 as he had not had five years of continuous education in the country.

Personal life
On 18 January 2013, Rangel drove around Swansea with his wife Nikki to distribute food to the homeless. He told CNN: "We went for something to eat in a local sandwich chain and overheard the manager saying they had to throw out food as they were about to close for the night. My wife, Nikki, who is a very caring and charitable person, asked if we could have them for the homeless rather than see them thrown in the bin. They agreed and we drove around Swansea for over an hour, but couldn't find any homeless people as it was so cold out on the streets with all the snow. We decided to tweet a plea and we were guided to a local charity shelter who looked after the homeless." He was so pleased with the reaction to his gesture he confirmed that he would be helping out again.

On 5 April 2013, Rangel announced plans to hold charity auctions with his wife and teammates Chico Flores, Ben Davies, Jonathan de Guzmán, Pablo Hernández, Michu and Itay Shechter, to raise money for the Severn Hospice in Telford, Maggie's Cancer Centre in Swansea and The Christian Lewis Trust Kids Cancer Charity; among the top prizes on offer at one of the auctions were Rangel's personal box for the game against Manchester City, and a visit to a Formula One garage during qualifying of the German Grand Prix. He was inspired to do this by Nikki, who has had three family members diagnosed with cancer.

Club statistics

Honours
Swansea City
Football League Cup: 2012–13
Football League Championship play-offs: 2011
Football League One: 2007–08

Individual
PFA Team of the Year: 2007–08 League One
The Football League Team of the Decade

References

External links

Swansea City official profile

1982 births
Living people
People from Montsià
Sportspeople from the Province of Tarragona
Spanish footballers
Footballers from Catalonia
Association football defenders
Segunda División B players
Tercera División players
CF Reus Deportiu players
Girona FC players
UE Sant Andreu footballers
Terrassa FC footballers
Premier League players
English Football League players
Swansea City A.F.C. players
Queens Park Rangers F.C. players
Spanish expatriate footballers
Expatriate footballers in Wales
Expatriate footballers in England
Spanish expatriate sportspeople in Wales
Spanish expatriate sportspeople in England